The 2011–12 season was Arbroath's first season back in the Scottish Second Division, having been promoted from the Scottish Third Division at the end of the 2010–11 season. Arbroath also competed in the Challenge Cup, League Cup and the Scottish Cup.

Summary
Arbroath finished second in the Second Division, entering the play-offs losing 2–1 to Dumbarton on aggregate in the semi final and remained in the Second Division. They reached the first round of the Challenge Cup, the first round of the League Cup and the fourth round of the Scottish Cup, losing 4–0 to Scottish Premier League side Rangers.

Results and fixtures

Second Division

First Division play-offs

Scottish Cup

Challenge Cup

League Cup

Squad 
Last updated 13 May 2012 

 

    
 
 

|}
a.  Includes other competitive competitions, including the play-offs and the 2011–12 Scottish Challenge Cup.

Disciplinary record 
Includes all competitive matches.
Last updated 13 May 2012

Awards

Last updated 28 March 2012

Team statistics

League table

Transfers

Players in

Players out

References

Arbroath F.C. seasons
Arbroath